Jack Harrington (26 June 1930 – 11 December 2014) was an Australian rules footballer who played with Essendon in the Victorian Football League (VFL).  An eye injury ended his VFL career at the age of 27.

Notes

External links 		
		
Jack Harrington's profile at Australianfootball.com		
		
		
		

1930 births
2014 deaths
Australian rules footballers from Victoria (Australia)		
Essendon Football Club players
Colac Football Club players